Democratic Federation may refer to:

The original name of the Social Democratic Federation, a former British political party
The original name of Justice (newspaper), published by the Social Democratic Federation
 Democratic Federation (Sardinia), a former political party
Democratic Federation of Burma, a political organization

See also 
Democratic Federation of Labour

Social Democratic Federation